Crocus haussknechtii is species of flowering plant growing from a corm native to southern Jordan, northern Iraq to western Iran.

Description
Crocus haussknechtii is a herbaceous perennial geophyte growing from a corm. The corm is surrounded by a tunic with silky, 7-9 cm long fibers, that rise above the corm. The stigmatic branches are about half of the length of the perianth segments. The throat of the perianth is bearded. The leaves appear after flowering.

References

haussknechtii
Flora of Jordan
Flora of Iraq
Flora of Iran
Plants described in 1882